Mount Tagubud, also known as  Mount Pandadagsaan or White Peak, is the highest mountain in the province of Davao de Oro in the Philippines with an elevation of   above sea level. Located in New Bataan Davao de Oro, Davao Region in the island of Mindanao Philippines, Mount Tagubud is the source of the Agusan River.

References

Mountains of the Philippines
Landforms of Davao de Oro